Rishab Prasanna  is an Indian flute or bansuri player. He was born in New Delhi. He is son of flute and shehnai player Rajendra Prasanna.

Career
Rishab Prasanna learned Indian classical music from his grandfather, Raghunath Prasanna, his father Rajendra Prasanna, and his uncles Ravi Shankar Prasanna and Rakesh Prasanna.

Apart from his solo concert, Rishab Prasanna also plays with his brother, Rajesh Prasanna.

He has worked on several projects with musicians in Europe

Rishab has played at the WOMAD Festivals in Australia, and New Zealand, the Festival international de la musique andalou, in Algeria, Les Allées Chantent in Isère (France), Musique et Patrimoine in Chinon (France), the Darbar Festival in London, Festival Messiaen  among others.

Title
Rishab has been awarded as the cultural ambassador of French city Toulouse (France) in the year 2016. 
He is also a recipient of National Award of India, "Ustad Bismillah Khan Yuva Puraskar", Sangeet Natak Academy Award by Ministry of Culture, India in 2021.

References

External links
Official website

1985 births
Living people
Indian flautists
Indian male composers
Bansuri players
Indian classical composers